The 1924–25 Montreal Canadiens season was the team's 16th season and eighth as a member of the National Hockey League (NHL). The Canadiens once again made it to the Stanley Cup Final but lost to the Victoria Cougars.

Regular season

This was the first season for the Montreal Maroons and Boston Bruins – the first American NHL team. The Montreal Forum, was built to house the Maroons. However, it was the Canadiens who played in it first. The season started earlier, on November 29, and because the Mount Royal Arena couldn't produce ice, it was decided to move a game against the Toronto St. Patricks to the Forum. The Canadiens beat the St. Patricks 7–1, as Billy Boucher scored a hat trick before 8000 fans.

The Canadiens improved their scoring, scoring 93 goals in 30 games, giving up 56.  Georges Vezina led the league in goals against average of 1.9 per game. All six team's starting goalie had a GAA under 4. Aurel Joliat led the Canadiens on offence, scoring 29 goals.

Final standings

Record vs. opponents

Schedule and results

Playoffs

NHL Championship
The third seed Montreal Canadiens played against the second seed Toronto St. Patricks in a total goals series. The winner of that series was to go on and play the first seed team, the Hamilton Tigers. But it was not to happen that way. During the total goals series, the Hamilton players demanded $200 each for the extra six games played during the regular season and the league threatened to suspend the players and the team. Last-ditch efforts to reach a compromise failed and the Tigers were suspended. It was suggested that the Ottawa Senators be included in the playoffs, but Charlie Querrie and Leo Dandurand cited a fourth-place finish didn't qualify Ottawa a playoff berth and it was decided that Montreal and Toronto had played for the league title. NHL president Frank Calder announced that the Canadiens played home games at the Forum, but Leo Dandurand said that they would be played at Mount Royal Arena unless it were necessary to move to the Forum, citing home games were home games, and the Canadiens played better in front of their own fans. Calder backed down from his stand. Montreal won the series against Toronto and was awarded the Prince of Wales Trophy and earned the right to play for the Stanley Cup.

Montreal Canadiens vs. Toronto St. Patricks

Montreal wins total goals series 5 goals to 2

Finals

Over in the Western Canada Hockey League, the third place Victoria Cougars won their league championship and would face the Montreal Canadiens for the Stanley Cup championship. Victoria easily beat Montreal three games to one out-scoring the Canadiens 16 to 8. Games one, three and four of the series were played at the Patrick Arena in Oak Bay, a suburb municipality of Victoria, British Columbia; game two was played at the larger Denman Arena in Vancouver.   This marks the first, and last, time since the inception of the NHL (1917) that a non-NHL team won the Stanley Cup. As a foot-note, the Seattle Metropolitans could have claimed the Stanley Cup during the flu cancelled season of 1919, but chose not to as a display of good-sportsmanship.

Montreal Canadiens vs. Victoria Cougars

Victoria Cougars win best-of-five series 3 games to 1 for the Stanley Cup

Awards and records
 O'Brien Cup – NHL champion
 Prince of Wales Trophy – NHL champion (not awarded in 1925, but inscribed on the Trophy later)

Transactions

References

See also
 1924–25 NHL season

Montreal Canadiens seasons
Montreal
Montreal